Decantha is a genus of moths belonging to the family Oecophoridae.

The species of this genus are found in Europe and Northern America.

Species:
 Decantha boreasella Chambers, 1873
 Decantha borkhausenii (Zeller, 1839)

References

Oecophoridae
Moth genera